The 1920 United States Senate elections in Arizona took place on November 2, 1920. Incumbent Democratic U.S. Senator Marcus A. Smith ran for reelection to a third term, but was defeated by former Delegate to the U.S. House of Representatives from the Arizona Territory Ralph H. Cameron in the general election. Cameron would become the first Republican elected to the office of U.S. Senator from Arizona since the state joined the union in 1912. The same year, Republican Governor Thomas Edward Campbell was reelected to a second term.

Democratic primary
The Democratic primary took place on September 8, 1920. Incumbent U.S. Senator Marcus A. Smith was the recipient of a significant challenge in the Democratic primary, notably by Maricopa County Superior Court judge Rawghlie Clement Stanford, who would go on to become Arizona's fifth Governor in 1937. Fellow lawyer Albinus A. Worsley, as well as John W. Norton also ran in the primary. Smith narrowly staved off his primary challengers and went on to compete in the general election in November.

Candidates
 Marcus A. Smith, incumbent U.S. Senator
 Rawghlie Clement Stanford, Maricopa County Superior Court
 Albinus A. Worsley, lawyer
 John W. Norton

Results

Republican primary

Candidates
 Ralph H. Cameron, Delegate to the U.S. House of Representatives from the Arizona Territory
 Elias S. Clark, Arizona Territorial Attorney General
 Thomas Maddock, Arizona State Highway Engineer
 Edward Robinson

Results

General election

See also 
 United States Senate elections, 1920 and 1921

References

1920
Arizona
United States Senate